Rémi Prieur (born April 17, 1997) is an Austrian-born-French-American soccer player.

Career

Youth, college & amateur 
Prieur played with the San Jose Earthquakes academy prior to playing college soccer at Saint Mary's College of California in 2015. He didn't see any first team action as a freshman, but went on to make 55 appearances for the Gaels. Prieur earned All-America Third Team recognition and was named WCC Goalkeeper of the Year during his 2018 season. Prieur also earned All-America Second Team honors and was named WCC Goalkeeper of the Year for the second consecutive season following his senior year in 2019.

Whilst at college, Prieur played in the USL League Two with Burlingame Dragons, San Francisco City and Portland Timbers U23s.

Professional 
On January 13, 2020, Prieur was selected 47th overall in the 2020 MLS SuperDraft by Columbus Crew SC. However, he did not sign the club.

On February 17, 2020, Prieur signed with USL Championship side Sporting Kansas City II. He made his debut on July 29, 2020, starting against Louisville City FC in a 2–1 win. Following the 2021 season, Kansas City opted to declined their contract option on Prieur.

Personal
Prieur was born in Mödling, Austria, but raised in San Ramon, California, in the United States. He also holds dual American and French citizenship.

References

External links 
 Remi Prieur - Men's Soccer Saint Mary's California bio
 

1997 births
Living people
American people of French descent
American soccer players
Association football goalkeepers
Burlingame Dragons FC players
Columbus Crew draft picks
French footballers
People from San Ramon, California
Portland Timbers U23s players
Saint Mary's Gaels men's soccer players
San Francisco City FC players
Soccer players from California
Sporting Kansas City II players
Sportspeople from the San Francisco Bay Area
USL Championship players
USL League Two players